Barbas of Constantinople (died 430) was Arian Archbishop of Constantinople from 407 until his death in 430.

References

Year of birth unknown
430 deaths
Arian Archbishops of Constantinople
5th-century Byzantine bishops